NexTone Inc. is a Japanese copyright collective that stands between copyright holders and users of music, not only managing music works and contents, but also promoting the use of music through digital content distribution and casting businesses, system development, and services for music publishers. It also promotes the use of music through digital content distribution and casting businesses, system development, and services for music publishers. Its headquarters is located in Hiroo, Shibuya, Tokyo, Japan. Major shareholders include Amuse Inc. and 

History 

The company was listed on the Mothers section of the Tokyo Stock Exchange as of March 30, 2020. (Code: 7094)

On November 12, 2021, the company became YouTube's preferred distributor partner for digital content distribution operations.

Copyright management business 
As a copyright management business, it receives consignments from copyright holders, such as composers and music publishers, and licenses their use and collects and distributes royalties.

Digital contents distribution business 
Aggregation of digital content, mainly music, for sale to domestic and international distributors.

Casting and consulting business 
The company also provides various casting services to meet the needs of general companies, advertising agencies, and other users, as well as copyright consulting services, education, and training services for all situations.

Location 

 Ebisu Prime Square Tower 20F, 1-1-39 Hiroo, Shibuya, Tokyo, Japan

References

Group companies 

 NexTone Systems inc.
 MCJP Inc.

See also

External links 

 
 
2020 initial public offerings
Companies established in 2000
Music companies of Japan